Bevismyia basuto is a species of tephritid or fruit flies in the genus Bevismyia of the family Tephritidae.

Distribution
Lesotho.

References

Tephritinae
Insects described in 1957
Diptera of Africa